Kodi James Whitley (born February 21, 1995) is an American professional baseball pitcher in the St. Louis Cardinals organization. He has played in Major League Baseball (MLB) for the Cardinals. He made his MLB debut in 2020.

Amateur career
Whitley attended Cleveland High School outside of Clayton, North Carolina. In 2013, his senior year, he earned all-conference honors. Undrafted in the 2013 Major League Baseball draft, he enrolled at the University of Mount Olive, where he played college baseball.

In 2014, Whitley's freshman year, he pitched to a 6–2 record with a 2.74 ERA over 13 games (ten starts), earning Conference Carolinas Freshman of the Year. That summer, he played in the Coastal Plain League for the Fayetteville SwampDogs. As a sophomore at Mount Olive in 2015, he appeared in 17 games (making 14 starts) in which he went 8–4 with a 4.41 ERA, striking out 88 batters over  innings. After the year, he returned to play in the Coastal Plain League with Fayetteville, earning All-Star honors. Prior to the 2016 season, Whitley underwent Tommy John surgery, forcing him to miss the year. In 2017, he pitched only five innings. After the year, he was drafted by the St. Louis Cardinals in the 27th round of the 2017 Major League Baseball draft.

Professional career
Whitley signed with St. Louis and made his professional debut with the Gulf Coast League Cardinals. He also appeared in one game for the Palm Beach Cardinals at the end of the season. Over  innings between both clubs, he compiled a 1.53 ERA and 22 strikeouts. In 2018, he pitched for the Peoria Chiefs, going 4–2 with a 2.51 ERA over 41 games (two starts), and in 2019, he began the year with Palm Beach before being promoted to the Springfield Cardinals in April and to the Memphis Redbirds in July. Over fifty relief appearances between the three clubs, Whitley went 3–4 with a 1.60 ERA, striking out 78 batters over  innings. He was selected to play in the Arizona Fall League for the Glendale Desert Dogs following the season.

On July 20, 2020, it was announced that Whitley had made the Cardinals 2020 Opening Day roster. He made his debut on July 26 at Busch Stadium against the Pittsburgh Pirates, facing three batters and retiring them all over one inning in relief. On August 4, it was announced that Whitley had tested positive for COVID-19, and he was subsequently placed on the injured list. He returned to the team on September 22. Over  innings with St. Louis, he compiled a 1.93 ERA with five strikeouts. In 2021, Whitley did not make the Opening Day roster. He was recalled on April 13, but optioned back to Memphis on April 17. On April 30, he was recalled again. On May 30, the Cardinals placed Whitley on the injured list with back spasms. He was activated on July 11 and optioned to Memphis. He was recalled to St. Louis on August 28 and spent the remainder of the season with them. Over 25 relief appearances with the Cardinals, Whitley compiled a 2.49 ERA and 27 strikeouts over  innings. He was sent outright off the roster on November 1, 2022.

References

External links

1995 births
Living people
People from Clayton, North Carolina
Baseball players from North Carolina
Major League Baseball pitchers
St. Louis Cardinals players
Mount Olive Trojans baseball players
Gulf Coast Cardinals players
Peoria Chiefs players
Palm Beach Cardinals players
Springfield Cardinals players
Memphis Redbirds players
Glendale Desert Dogs players